Ulrik Wisløf (born 12 July 1968) is a Norwegian researcher, a professor and an entrepreneur in the field of exercise physiology, and the Head of the Cardiac Exercise Research Group (55 employees) (ntnu.edu/cerg) at the Dept. of Circulation and Medical Imaging, Norwegian University of Science and Technology, and he is also a Honorary Professor at University of Queensland Australia. He was appointed professor in 2008 and quickly built up an international, transdisciplinary and competitive group, as documented by >280 peer-reviewed publications and ~72 000 citations. According to Google Scholar, he figures among the world's 4 most cited scientists in the broad field of “exercise” and the most cited Exercise Physiologist worldwide. Many of his publications demonstrate his group's capacity to translate basic experimental research into clinical use in a short timeframe. He has served as PI of several successful national and international collaborations, demonstrating scientific leadership. He is working on projects related to optimising the benefits of exercise training in health and disease and utilising technologies to improve adherence to exercise training. Wisløff and colleagues provided the first causative evidence that low exercise capacity per se dramatically increased risk of heart disease. The study published in Science in 2005, with commentary in Nature Medicine, was ranked as one of the most important papers in the metabolism field at the time. They subsequently showed that high-intensity exercise training was safe and lead to superior improvements in aerobic capacity (fitness) and cardiac function in heart failure patients (Circulation, 2007). This line of research formed the basis for his research group; with later studies showing optimal results with high intensity exercise in various lifestyle related disorders. They revealed that temporal changes in resting heart rate predict death from heart disease in the general population (JAMA, 2011). This led to creation of a calculator to estimate fitness and so predict death in the general population. The calculator is free and available on the web and all app stores. To date 9.5 million users have used the fitness calculator; they also agreed to share their data in research. The American Heart Association now advocates the use of their fitness calculator in clinical practice (Circulation, 2016). Wisløff is also the inventor of the Personalized Activity Intelligence (PAI); a metric that calculates how much physical activity a person needs to be protected against life-style related disease and premature death. The PAI app is free and available in all app stores. Wisløff's group has translated basic experimental evidence into clinical trials (and patient benefit) within a remarkably short timeframe, with research spanning from molecules to society, and back again. His record of accomplishment demonstrates leadership, capability and innovation required to perform ground-breaking research. Wisløff is also a committed mentor who actively supports next-generation scientists, and have personally supervised 22 postdoctoral fellows and 38 PhD students, who have gone on to have successful careers in both industry and academia. In February 2020 professor Ulrik Wisloff was awarded the Norwegian Health Association's (Nasjonalforeningen for folkehelsen's) Heart Research Award. The price was handed over by the King of Norway.

Wisløff has also done research on football physiology, and he is responsible for the research on physical training for the Norwegian Center of Football Excellence. He has received international awards for his sciences.

Awards
 2020: The Norwegian national association's cardiology Research award 2020
 2011: K.G. Jebsen Center of Exercise in Medicine (4 year funding; 1 250 000 Euro each year)
 2008: Ole Storsteins Award for excellence in cardiovascular science from Norwegian Society of Cardiology
 2007: Young Investigator Award 2008-2012 (4 year funding; 600 000 Euro each year)
 2007: The American College of Sports Medicine New Investigator Award for 2007
 2005: The European Society of Cardiology, Working Groups on Cardiac Rehabilitation & Exercise Physiology, Prize for best oral presentation for the study ”Anti-remodelling effect of interval training in patients with post-infarction heart failure”
 2005: National Scientific Award, Norwegian Society of Cardiology, for the study ”Anti-remodelling effect of interval training in patients with post-infarction heart failure”
 2004: National Award in Medical Technology, for the study “NOS inhibition increases bubble formation and reduces survival in sedentary but not exercised rats” published in J. Physiol. 2003 Jan 15;546(Pt 2):577-82
 2001: American College of Sports Medicine & International Relations Committee; 2001 International Student Award for the study “Endurance Training Improves Myocyte Contractile Function, and Restores Myocardial SERCA-2 Levels in Postinfarction Rats”.
 2000: European Society of Cardiology: Stress testing and cardiac rehabilitation in heart failure (Udine, Italy).
 2000: Award for best oral presentation from the study "Training effects on post-infarction heart failure in rats: Remodeling, contractility and calcium handling".
 1997: National Scientific Award, Norwegian Society of Exercise Physiology, “The Nycomed-prize”,  1997 for the study "Strength and endurance of elite soccer players"

Publications

 Ulrik Wisløff

1968 births
Living people
Academic staff of the Norwegian University of Science and Technology
Norwegian physiologists